Marina Skordi (born 16 May 1962) is a Greek sprinter. She competed in the women's 200 metres at the 1988 Summer Olympics.

References

External links
 

1962 births
Living people
Athletes (track and field) at the 1988 Summer Olympics
Greek female sprinters
Olympic athletes of Greece
Olympic female sprinters
Sportspeople from Arta, Greece
20th-century Greek women